There are numerous sports teams in Erie, Pennsylvania, all of which are minor league. There are also numerous college sports teams along with high school teams. Pennsylvania Interscholastic Athletic Association District 10 high school sports are played in the area, often with close results due to the even distribution of athletic talent. Throughout history, Erie has had various semi-pro and professional sports teams. The city hosts the nationally recognized McDonald's Classic.

Baseball

The Erie SeaWolves play baseball in the Double-A Northeast, affiliated with the Detroit Tigers. They play at UPMC Park.

The SeaWolves were originally the Single-A affiliate for the Pittsburgh Pirates. Coincidentally, the "Pirates" moniker originated with the Pittsburgh Alleghenys' pursuit of second-baseman and Erie native, Lou Bierbauer, in 1891. Bierbauer started his career with the Philadelphia Athletics of the American Association, later joining the Brooklyn Ward's Wonders of the newfound Players' League for the 1890 season. When the Players' League folded in 1891, most of the members went back to their former National League or American Association clubs. However, Bierbauer never signed a contract to return to the Athletics, and the Alleghenys were determined to sign him before other teams noticed. Ned Hanlon, manager of the Alleghenys, braved the icy conditions of Presque Isle during a snowstorm to commit Bierbauer. When the Athletics learned about this secret deal, they objected to Bierbauer's signing and demanded his return to their club. An official with the American Association also objected to Bierbauer's contract with the Alleghenys, calling their actions "piratical." Yet, the  league ruled in favor of the Alleghenys, and they acquired Bierbauer as a free agent. Soon afterward, both players and their fans referred to the team as the "Pittsburgh Pirates." In 1891, the club officially rebranded as the "Pirates," making light of their critics.

In the past, Erie was home to other minor league baseball teams, including the Erie Cardinals, Erie Orioles, and Erie Sailors.

Hockey
The Erie Otters play hockey in the Ontario Hockey League at Erie Insurance Arena.

Connor McDavid, a Canadian center, played for the Erie Otters from 2012 to 2015, before joining the Edmonton Oilers of the National Hockey League (NHL). The Otters chose him as their first overall pick in the OHL Priority Selection Draft. The NHL Central Scouting Bureau subsequently named McDavid the top North American prospect for the 2015 NHL Entry Draft, where the Oilers selected him first overall. The Greater Toronto Hockey League named McDavid "Player of the Year" for the 2011–12 season following a record of 79 goals and 130 assists.  Hockey Canada, the governing body for amateur hockey in Canada, granted McDavid "Exceptional Player" status, which permitted him to play in the OHL a year earlier than would otherwise be permissible for a player his age.  He was only the third player to receive that status, after John Tavares and Aaron Ekblad.

Prior to the Otters, the Erie Panthers and Erie Blades were professional hockey teams based in Erie.

Basketball
The Erie BayHawks played basketball in the NBA G League at Erie Insurance Arena from 2008 to 2021.

From 1990 to 1992 the Erie Wave were part of the World Basketball League.

Soccer
Erie Commodores FC play soccer in the National Premier Soccer League at McConnell Family Stadium.

Stock car racing
Outside of North East, Pennsylvania is Lake Erie Speedway, a 3/8 mile (0.6 km) NASCAR 
sanctioned race track.

Hammett PA is Eriez Speedway, 3/8 mile dirt track

Professional athletes from Erie
Sig Andrusking, American football player
Richard Arrington, consensus All-American football player and wrestler at Notre Dame, pioneering African-American athlete
Art Baker, professional football player, Buffalo Bills, All-American and NCAA National Championship winner in both football and wrestling, pioneering African-American athlete
Bruce Baumgartner, heavyweight Olympic wrestler, most decorated American wrestler of all time, National Wrestling Hall of Fame
Lou Bierbauer, 19th-century Major League Baseball player
Fred Biletnikoff, professional football player, Oakland Raiders, Super Bowl MVP, Pro Football Hall of Fame
Jimmy Carr, youngest-ever American Olympic wrestler, National Wrestling Hall of Fame
Nate Carr, Olympic wrestler (bronze medalist), three-time NCAA champion Iowa State University, National Wrestling Hall of Fame
James Conner, professional football player, Pittsburgh Steelers
Clifton Crosby, professional football player, Indianapolis Colts
Tim Federowicz, professional baseball player, Los Angeles Dodgers
George Flint, professional football player, Buffalo Bills
Eric Hicks, professional football player, Kansas City Chiefs
Sam Jethroe, Negro league and Major League baseball player from 1926 to 1966
Jovon Johnson, professional football player, Ottawa Redblacks, CFL's Most Outstanding Defensive Player Award
Caryn Kadavy, figure skater, 1987 World Bronze Medalist, 1988 Olympian
Tom Lawless, professional baseball player, St. Louis Cardinals, Toronto Blue Jays, and Montreal Expos
Bob Learn, Jr., professional bowler, 1999 U.S. Open champion who also rolled the PBA's 10th televised 300 game
Frank Liebel, professional football defensive back in the National Football League who played 7 seasons for the New York Giants and 1 with the Chicago Bears
Kayla McBride, professional basketball player, San Antonio Stars, first-team All-American for Notre Dame; was a member of senior class that reached four Final Fours in four years, including three championship games
Mike McCoy, professional football player, Green Bay Packers, unanimous first-team All-American for Notre Dame and 1969 Heisman Trophy candidate
Bob Sanders, professional football player, Indianapolis Colts
Brian Stablein, professional football player, Indianapolis Colts and Detroit Lions
Mark Stepnoski, professional football player, Dallas Cowboys and Houston/Tennessee Oilers
Ed Hinkel, professional football player, Indianapolis Colts and Baltimore Ravens

References